Preactiniidae is a family of sea anemones in the order Actiniaria The family contains two species in two monotypic genera.

List of genera
 genus Dactylanthus
 Dactylanthus antarcticus (Clubb, 1908)
 genus Preactis
 Preactis millardae England in England & Robson, 1984 ("walking anemone")

References

 
Actinioidea
Cnidarian families